KBFT 89.9 FM is a Community radio station, owned and operated by the Bois Forte Tribal Council. Licensed to Nett Lake, Minnesota, United States, the station serves the Bois Forte Indian Reservation at Nett Lake.

See also
List of community radio stations in the United States

References

External links
KBFT's website

Community radio stations in the United States
Native American radio
Radio stations in Minnesota